Broomfield is a consolidated city and county located in the U.S. state of Colorado. Broomfield has a consolidated government which operates under Article XX, Sections 10-13 of the Constitution of the State of Colorado. The Broomfield population was 74,112 at the 2020 United States Census, making it the 15th most populous municipality and the 12th most populous county in Colorado. Broomfield is a part of the Denver–Aurora–Lakewood, CO Metropolitan Statistical Area and the Front Range Urban Corridor.

History
Several railroads figure in the development of this area. The Colorado Central Railroad built a narrow gauge line from Golden in 1873, the Denver, Utah and Pacific Railroad arrived in 1881, and the Denver, Marshall and Boulder Railway built a line through what would become Broomfield in 1886. The Denver, Utah and Pacific was widened to standard gauge in 1889. One of the early names for the area was Zang's Spur, after the railroad spur serving Adolph Zang's grain fields.

The municipality of Broomfield was incorporated in 1961 in the southeastern corner of Boulder County. While it is unsure how it received its name, most researchers guess it is from the broomcorn grown in the area, a tall sorghum that farmers sold for use as brooms and whisk brooms. Over the next three decades, the city grew through annexations. Eventually, Broomfield spilled into portions of four counties: Adams, Boulder, Jefferson and Weld.

In the 1990s, city leaders felt increasing chagrin with the need to deal with four separate court districts, four different county seats, and four separate county sales tax bases. They began pushing to make Broomfield a consolidated city-county similar to Denver, reasoning that they could provide services more responsively if it had its own county government. They sought an amendment to the Colorado State Constitution to create a new county. The amendment was passed in 1998, after which a three-year transition period followed. On November 15, 2001, Broomfield County became the 64th and smallest county of Colorado. It is the most recently created county in Colorado, and also in the United States as a whole if county equivalents are not included.

On February 20, 2021, United Airlines Flight 328 from Denver to Honolulu experienced an engine failure after takeoff from Denver International Airport and debris from the engine landed in parts of Broomfield. Multiple homes were damaged, but no injuries were reported, and the plane landed safely at DIA.

Geography
Broomfield is located midway between downtown Denver and Boulder along U.S. Route 36. Its coordinates are  (39.931817, -105.065919).

The elevation in Broomfield ranges from 5,096 to 5,856 feet. At the 2020 United States Census, Broomfield had a total area of  including  of water. It is the smallest county by area in Colorado and the 5th smallest in the United States. Broomfield is the second most densely populated county in Colorado behind Denver.

Airport
Rocky Mountain Metropolitan Airport formerly known as Jefferson County (Jeffco) Airport is located in Broomfield.

Major highways
  Interstate 25
  U.S. Highway 36 (Denver-Boulder Turnpike)
  U.S. Highway 85
  U.S. Highway 287
  State Highway 7
  State Highway 121
  State Highway 128
 E-470 (tollway)
 Northwest Parkway (tollway)

Adjacent counties
Weld County – northeast
Adams County – southeast
Jefferson County – southwest
Boulder County – northwest

Climate

According to the Köppen climate classification system, Broomfield has a Cold Semi-arid climate (BSk). According to the United States Department of Agriculture, the Plant Hardiness zone is 6a with an average annual extreme minimum temperature of -9.4 °F (-23.0 °C).

Ecology

According to the A. W. Kuchler U.S. Potential natural vegetation Types, Broomfield would have a Grama, aka Bouteloua / Buffalo grass (65) vegetation type and a Shortgrass prairie (17) vegetation form.

Demographics

Broomfield is a part of the Denver-Aurora-Lakewood, CO Metropolitan Statistical Area.

The 2017 census estimates there were 68,341 people living in the city. The population density was 2,193 per square mile as of the 2010 census. The racial makeup of the city was 86.1 percent White, 11.1 percent Hispanic or Latino, 6.1 percent Asian, 2.1 percent from two or more races, 1.1 percent African American, 0.6 percent Native American, and 0.1 percent Pacific Islander.

There were 22,016 households, of which 41.2 percent had children under the age of 18 living with them, 61.8 percent were married couples living together, 8.2 percent had a female householder with no husband present, and 25.8 percent were non-families. 19.3 percent of all households were made up of individuals, and 4.2 percent had someone living alone who was 65 years of age or older. The average household size was 2.76 people, and the average family size was 3.19 people.

Age distribution figures show 26.2 percent of residents under the age of 18 and 9.9 percent age 65 years or older. The median age was 36.4 years. Females made up 50.2% of the population.

The median household income was $79,034 and the median family income was $96,206 in 2013. The per capita income for the city was $38,792. 48.1 percent of the population over age 25 held a bachelor's degree or higher.

Politics
When the county was formed in 2001, it was a swing county, and the city itself has voted for the winner of the national popular vote in each presidential election from 2004 to 2020. In the 2012 election, incumbent president and Democrat Barack Obama defeated Republican Mitt Romney by roughly five percentage points. In recent years, the county has trended towards the Democratic Party. In 2016, it voted decisively for Hillary Clinton. Joe Biden won the county by an even larger margin in 2020. 

Since its inception, Broomfield County has voted for the winner of Colorado's electoral votes. 

As of March 1, 2021, 15,671 voters were Democrats, 11,658 voters were Republicans, and 23,354 voters were not affiliated with any party.

Economy
In the 1990s, Broomfield and other area suburbs experienced tremendous economic growth, much of it focused in technology.

The Flatiron Crossing Mall is a large shopping and entertainment center, anchored by Dick's Sporting Goods, Macy's, and Forever 21.

The Broomfield Enterprise is the local newspaper. KBDI-TV, the secondary PBS member station for the Denver area, is licensed to Broomfield.

Ball, Vail Resorts, MWH Global, Flatiron Construction, Webroot, Noodles & Company, WhiteWave Foods and Mrs. Fields are headquartered in Broomfield.

Top employers
According to Broomfield's 2020 Comprehensive Annual Financial Report, the top employers in the city are:

Recreation

Broomfield's recreation opportunities include the Paul Derda Recreation Center and pool, athletic fields, courts and rinks and open space and trails.

Broomfield has an extensive trail system that connects the various lakes and parks. A scenic trail connects the Stearns Lake and the Josh's Pond on the west side of town. Broomfield also has a 9/11 memorial containing a piece of a steel beam from one of the towers.

Broomfield also has a skate park with many different features such as bowls, a large half pipe and several "street" obstacles.

Government

 Mayor – Guyleen Castriotta 
 Mayor Pro-Tem – Stan Jezierski
 City and County Manager – Jennifer Hoffman
 City and County Attorney – Nancy Rodgers

Council members
 Ward 1
 Stan Jezierski 
 James Marsh-Holschen
 Ward 2
 William Lindstedt 
 Austin Ward
 Ward 3
 Jean Lim 
 Deven Shaff 
 Ward 4
 Bruce Leslie
 Laurie Anderson 
 Ward 5
 Heidi Henkel 
 Todd Cohen

Sheriff and county commissioners
Broomfield operates as a consolidated city-county. The city council acts simultaneously as the board of county commissioners, and the police chief is simultaneously the county sheriff. The Broomfield Police Department performs all of the duties that would normally be performed by a county sheriff's office, including operating the county jail (detention center), providing security and bailiff services for the Broomfield Municipal, County, and District Courts and the Combined Courts Building, and providing civil process in the county. The police chief can be hired or fired at will by the city council, which makes Broomfield's sheriff, along with Denver's, the only non-elected sheriffs in the state.

Education

Since Broomfield used to be divided among four counties, students living in the city were served by the separate school districts for their county. While the city is now united within one county, the city is still separated among multiple school districts.

School districts that have sections of Broomfield:
 Adams County District Twelve Five Star Schools
 Boulder Valley School District RE-2
 School District 27J
 Weld County School District RE-8
 Jefferson County School District R-1
 St. Vrain Valley School District RE 1J

There are five school districts that overlap Broomfield, but the two largest school districts in Broomfield are Adams Twelve Five Star Schools and Boulder Valley School District.

Broomfield features two large public high schools (Broomfield High School, which underwent significant renovations from 2009 to 2010, and Legacy High), two public middle schools and eight public elementary schools. There are three private schools: Broomfield Academy, with an academic preschool, an elementary school and a middle school; Holy Family, a Catholic high school; and Nativity of Our Lord Parish, a Catholic elementary school. Broomfield also contains two K-12 charter schools, Prospect Ridge Academy, and Front Range Academy, which has two Broomfield campuses.

Notable people
Notable individuals who were born in or have lived in Broomfield or both include:
 Mark Boslough, physicist
 Drew Brown, musician, guitarist for OneRepublic and Debate Team
 Dianne Primavera, 50th Lieutenant Governor of Colorado and former member of the Colorado House of Representatives
 Anna Prins, basketball center
 Vince Russo, pro wrestling personality and podcaster 
 Steve Schmuhl, swimmer 
 Mike Wilpolt, football wide receiver, defensive back, coach
 Cat Zingano, bantamweight MMA fighter

See also

Colorado
Bibliography of Colorado
Index of Colorado-related articles
Outline of Colorado
List of counties in Colorado
List of municipalities in Colorado
List of places in Colorado
List of statistical areas in Colorado
Front Range Urban Corridor
North Central Colorado Urban Area
Denver-Aurora, CO Combined Statistical Area
Denver-Aurora-Lakewood, CO Metropolitan Statistical Area
Jefferson Parkway
Northwest Parkway
Rocky Flats National Wildlife Refuge
2013 Colorado floods

References

External links

City and County of Broomfield website
CDOT map of the City and County of Broomfield
History Colorado website

 
Cities in Colorado
Colorado counties
Denver metropolitan area
County seats in Colorado
Populated places established in 1961
Consolidated city-counties
1961 establishments in Colorado